Charles Henville Bayly (13 March 1807 – 25 January 1873) was an English cricketer with amateur status. He was born in Winchester, Hampshire, and educated at Winchester College and New College, Oxford. He played first-class cricket for Oxford University from 1827 to 1832. He was made a fellow of New College in 1838. He became a Church of England priest and was rector of Stratton St Michael, Norfolk, from 1839 until his death there in 1873.

References

1807 births
1873 deaths
English cricketers
English cricketers of 1826 to 1863
Oxford University cricketers
Cricketers from Winchester
People educated at Winchester College
Alumni of New College, Oxford
19th-century English Anglican priests